The Stockage Festival was originally a day of rock held April 13, 2002 in Fort Collins, Colorado, with members of the punk bands Descendents, ALL, and Black Flag. The event featured performances by the original three-piece Descendants line-up and a performances from seminal Southern California band The Last. There were more than forty bands at the two-day festival and ALL performed each night.

The festival returned to Fort Collins and The Starlight the next year, this time for a three-day stint.

External links
Pictures from Stockage '02

Rock festivals in the United States
2002 in the United States
2002 in Colorado
Fort Collins, Colorado